Tom Bamford (born 22 May 1963) is a New Zealand cyclist. He competed in the individual road race at the 1992 Summer Olympics.

References

External links
 

1963 births
Living people
New Zealand male cyclists
Olympic cyclists of New Zealand
Cyclists at the 1992 Summer Olympics
Sportspeople from Masterton